The Embassy of Colombia in Madrid is the diplomatic mission of the Republic of Colombia to the Kingdom of Spain; it is headed by the Ambassador of Colombia to Spain. It is located in the Salamanca district of Madrid, near the Church of San Fermín de los Navarros, the Sorolla Museum, the IE Business School, and the Palace of Bermejillo, precisely at Paseo General Martínez Campos, 48 at the intersection of Calle Fortuny, and it is serviced by the Rubén Darío station.

The Embassy is also accredited to the Principality of Andorra, the Kingdom of Morocco, and the Republic of Tunisia. The Embassy is charged with representing the interests of the President and Government of Colombia, improving diplomatic relations between Colombia and the accredited countries, promoting and improving the image and standing of Colombia in the accredited nations, promoting the Culture of Colombia, encouraging and facilitating tourism to and from Colombia, and ensuring the safety of Colombians abroad.

See also
Colombia–Spain relations

References

External links
 

Colombia–Spain relations
Madrid
Colombia
Buildings and structures in Almagro neighborhood, Madrid